Sailors Falls is a locality in central Victoria, Australia. The locality is named for the eponymous falls on Sailors Creek, a tributary of the Loddon River

References

External links

Towns in Victoria (Australia)